Charles Hoyt March (c. 1870 – August 28, 1945) was the chair of the Federal Trade Commission from January 1, 1933 to December 31, 1933, again from January 1, 1936 to December 31, 1936, and a third time from January 1, 1941 to December 31, 1941.

March served as Mayor of Litchfield, Minnesota, and as president of the Minnesota Farmers and Bankers Council before his appointment to the FTC. He was a delegate to the 1924 Republican National Convention. On January 19, 1929, Myers was nominated by President Calvin Coolidge to a seat on the FTC vacated by the resignation of Abram F. Myers, taking office on February 1, 1929. March served on the FTC for 16 years, until his death at the age of 75.

References

Federal Trade Commission personnel
1870s births
1945 deaths